The NW type D is a veteran automobile manufactured by Nesselsdorfer Wagenbau-Fabriks-Gesellschaft A.G. (NW, now known as Tatra) in 1902. Only three cars of the design were made.

Type D had same chassis as Type C, but with different body on it, and the production version was slower than the initial Type C - only 50 km/h.

References

Cars of the Czech Republic
Tatra vehicles
Cars introduced in 1904
Veteran vehicles
Rear mid-engine, rear-wheel-drive vehicles